The 2008 Asia Cup (also called Star Cricket Asia Cup) was a One Day International (ODI) cricket tournament, held in Pakistan from 24 June to 6 July 2008, at two venues. The six teams which took part in the tournament were India, Pakistan, Sri Lanka, Bangladesh and Asian associate nations UAE and Hong Kong. This was the first Asia Cup hosted by Pakistan; previously political tensions between India and Pakistan did not permit Pakistan to host the event in 1993. It was broadcast in India by Star Cricket and ESPN and in Pakistan by Geo Super. Sri Lanka won the tournament after beating India by 100 runs in the final.

Format 
Originally, the ninth version of the Cup was supposed to take place in 2006, however packed international cricket schedules did not allow for the tournament to be held.

Group A consisted of Bangladesh, Sri Lanka and the United Arab Emirates.

Group B consisted of India, Pakistan and Hong Kong.

The two groups first had a separate round-robin competition. The top two teams from each group advanced to the Super Fours. There was again a round-robin competition between the teams in the Super Four, the first two from which advanced to the final.

Venues 
13 matches were played in 2008 Asia Cup at National Stadium, Karachi and Gaddafi Stadium, Lahore.

Squads

Group stage

Group A 

All times are in UTC+5 (PST)

Group B 

All times are in UTC+5 (PST)

Super Fours 

All times are in UTC+5 (PST)

Final

Statistics

Most runs

Most wickets

References

External links 
 
 

2008 in Pakistani cricket
Asia Cup
Asia Cup, 2008
Cricket
International cricket competitions in Pakistan